Sophie Linn (born 13 March 1995 in Adelaide) is an Australian professional triathlete. She competed at the 2022 Commonwealth Games, in Mixed relay, winning a bronze medal.

Life 
Linn competed at the 2011 Commonwealth Youth Games. She competed for University of Michigan.

She competed at the 2022 Gold Coast Triathlon, winning a  gold medal, and 2022 World Triathlon Championship Series Hamburg, winning a silver medal.

References 

1995 births
Living people
Commonwealth Games bronze medallists for Australia
Australian female triathletes
University of Michigan alumni
Sportspeople from Adelaide
Sportswomen from South Australia
Triathletes at the 2022 Commonwealth Games
Commonwealth Games medallists in triathlon
Medallists at the 2022 Commonwealth Games